Blairville is a commune in the Pas-de-Calais department in the Hauts-de-France region in northern France.

Geography
A farming village located 8 miles (13 km) southwest of Arras on the D34 road.

Population

Sights
 The church of St. Vaast, which, like most of the village, was rebuilt after the ravages of World War I.

See also
Communes of the Pas-de-Calais department

References

Communes of Pas-de-Calais